Comi is a surname. Notable people with the surname include:

Anne Comi, American pediatric neurologist 
Antonio Comi (born 1964), Italian footballer
Francesco Comi (1682–1769), Italian painter
Gianmario Comi (born 1992), Italian footballer
Girolamo Comi (1507–1581), Italian painter
Lara Comi (born 1983), Italian politician
Paul Comi (1932–2016), American actor